Allison Elizabeth Aldrich (born January 19, 1988) is an American Paralympic volleyballist.

Early life
Aldrich was born in Schuyler, Nebraska. In 1995, when she was only 7 years old she was diagnosed with sarcoma a cell cancer. Aldrich was featured in Omaha World-Herald article in 2004. In March 2004 she received an invitation to a sitting volleyball camp in Denver, where she was tried for Paralympics. She graduated from Schuyler Central High School in 2006 and from that year attends Nebraska Wesleyan University. She used to be a member of National Honor Society from which she won the Ron Gustafson Inspirational Award.

Career
She got her first medal which was bronze in 2004 Paralympic Games which were held in Athens, Greece. In 2007, she won a silver medal for her participation in Sitting Volleyball Invitational. In 2008, she was awarded another silver medal in Paralympic Games in Beijing and the same year was given a bronze medal for participation at World Organization Volleyball for Disabled Intercontinental Cup. Gold medals for her started in 2009 when she won a Parapan American Zonal Championship and Paralympic EuroCup. 2010 brought her another silver medal for her participation in WOVD and another gold one for World Cup. The same year she participated and won at Parapan American Championship in Colorado where she earned another gold medal. In 2011, she was awarded with two more gold medals for her role in ECVD Continental Cup and for  PAZC. At 2012 Paralympic Games she was awarded a silver medal and won gold for Volleyball Masters.

Personal life
On occasion she travels to Shriners Hospital in Minneapolis, Minnesota to get a prosthetists opinion on her leg health which she lost in a battle with cancer at University of Nebraska Medical Center. In her spare time she likes to watch The Sisterhood of the Traveling Pants and Kobe Bryant. When it comes to sports she likes to watch Miami Dolphins and Los Angeles Lakers. She is also a Health Teacher at Walnut Middle School in Grand Island, Nebraska. She teaches safe sex, pregnancy, germs, cancer and many other health subjects.

References

External links

1988 births
Living people
Paralympic volleyball players of the United States
Paralympic bronze medalists for the United States
Paralympic silver medalists for the United States
Medalists at the 2004 Summer Paralympics
Medalists at the 2008 Summer Paralympics
Medalists at the 2012 Summer Paralympics
Volleyball players at the 2004 Summer Paralympics
Volleyball players at the 2008 Summer Paralympics
Volleyball players at the 2012 Summer Paralympics
American sitting volleyball players
Women's sitting volleyball players
People from Schuyler, Nebraska
Paralympic medalists in volleyball